The Fairfax County Police Department, commonly referred to as, "FCPD," is a law enforcement agency, located in the Commonwealth of Virginia in the Northern Virginia region of the commonwealth.

The Fairfax County Police Department's vision is to, "provide ethical leadership through engagement with the community to prevent and fight crime, improve the culture of safety at work and within the community to preserve the sanctity of all human life, and to keep pace with urbanization."

History

In the 1920s, the Fairfax County Board of Supervisors began appointing road police, whose job it was to patrol the roads of Fairfax County and arrest traffic violators. In February 1932, the Board relinquished control of the county traffic police, and the four officers employed, Captain Haywood J. Durrer, Carl R. McIntosh, Louis L. Finks and Arthur W. Mills, became special officers and deputy sheriffs under Fairfax County Sheriff Eppa P. Kirby.

The Fairfax County Police Department came into existence July 1, 1940.  Much of the credit for its establishment goes to the man who was then Fairfax County Sheriff, Eppa Kirby, a colorful character who never carried a gun. Overwhelmed with managing the inadequate county jail and law enforcement duties, Sheriff Kirby persuaded the Fairfax County Board of Supervisors to relieve him of his responsibilities for criminal police work by forming the police department. At the helm was Carl R. McIntosh, a deputy sheriff who became Fairfax County's first chief of police.

Chief McIntosh, five newly sworn police officers, and two clerks became the county's first police department employees. Three of the new officers were assigned to patrol the county's roads, while another was appointed detective sergeant. With far-reaching insight into what would eventually become one of the department's main areas of concern, Chief McIntosh appointed the fifth officer, John A. Millan as traffic sergeant on motorcycle patrol. Millan resigned shortly thereafter to accept a position as a revenue enforcement agent with the US Treasury Department's Prohibition Bureau.

A 1955 expansion authorized as part of the county budget allowed the creation of the department's juvenile bureau, headed by Detective David Eike, and its traffic division, headed by Lieutenant Lewis Shumate. Additionally, the department's detective bureau was consolidated at the FCPD headquarters in Fairfax under Lieutenant Grafton G. Wells and expanded with three new detectives.

William L. Durrer was appointed as acting chief of police in June 1957 by Fairfax County Executive Carlton C. Massey due to the illness of Chief McIntosh. Following Chief McIntosh's resignation in August, Durrer was appointed chief on October 30, 1957.

Joyce A. Harvell was sworn in as the FCPD's first female police officer in July 1957, working with the FCPD's Juvenile Bureau.

In July 1967, Christopher Stokes was hired as the department's first black policeman.

Accreditation
The department achieved its third re-accreditation from the Virginia Law Enforcement Professional Standards Commission in June 2009. Fairfax County is the first police department in the Commonwealth of Virginia to accomplish this milestone.

Organization
The current Chief of Police is Kevin Davis who was appointed on April 23, 2021. The three main divisions within the department are Administration, Investigations, and Operations, each commanded by a deputy chief. The Internal Affairs Bureau, Public Affairs Bureau, and Community Engagement and Equity reports directly to the Chief.

I. The Investigations Division contains the Motorcycle Squad, SWAT, K-9 Section, Explosive Ordinance Disposal (EOD), Helicopter Unit, Crime Scene Section and the Criminal Investigations Bureau.

Officers in the Motor Section keep traffic moving and control traffic at major incidents and crash scenes. They rely almost exclusively on Harley-Davidson motorcycles to get to the source of traffic problems. Specially trained and certified officers assigned to the Motor Carrier Safety Section inspect trucks and commercial vehicles for safety and legal regulations. They can take unsafe vehicles off the roads; by placing them out of service. The Crash Reconstruction Unit provides technical expertise and has investigative responsibility for all fatal crashes. The Traffic Safety Services Section acts as the department's coordination point for all regional and departmental traffic enforcement and safety education programs. Traffic Enforcement Officers address parking issues. The Traffic Division coordinates the Auxiliary Police Officers (APO) and Volunteers in Police Service programs. APOs handle both administrative and operational tasks, such as augmenting patrol, traffic control, and taking police reports. VIPS perform primarily administrative tasks throughout the department.

The primary investigative branch of the Department is divided into specializations: Major Crimes (murder, sex crimes, assault, robbery, vehicle theft, financial crimes, and crimes against children), Organized Crime and Narcotics, Criminal Intelligence, and Investigative Support (crime scene, fingerprints, etc.).

II. The Administration Division contains the Criminal Justice Academy, Central Records, the property room and the Public Information Office.

The Fairfax County Criminal Justice Academy trains recruits and prepares officers through constant, updated training and conducts the Citizen's Police Academy.

III. The Operations Division contains Animal Protection Police, Youth Services Division, and station detectives for property crimes.

Animal Protection Police officers are specially trained law enforcement officers who investigate dog bites and attacks and complaints of animal cruelty. They respond to emergencies involving sick or injured domestic and wild animals. They enforce county codes and state laws pertaining to animals. They remove strays from the community, often impounding them at the Fairfax County Animal Shelter where many can be reunited with their owners or adopted by new owners.

The vast majority of patrol officers operate out of eight district stations, which are as follows:
Mason District
McLean District
Mount Vernon District
Fair Oaks District
Franconia District
Reston District
Sully District
West Springfield District

Rank structure

Proposed Changes 
In 2016 FCPD underwent an extensive "public safety review" process. The presentation released following the conclusion of the process recommended several changes in FCPD rank and organizational structure. Among the recommendations are:

 Phase out the Second Lieutenant rank as those officers retire or are promoted, eventually removing the rank altogether. First-line patrol supervision would be made up of two Sergeants per shift per district, each commanding squads of around 6 officers. A single Lieutenant rank would replace the two current lieutenant ranks.
 Second-line supervision would consist of four Lieutenants, two for day and two for night, in the district station, rather than the current system in which the district Captain and district First Lieutenant are responsible for all second-line supervision. The senior Lieutenant would serve as Assistant District Commander.
 A separate Recruit rank is suggested, which would be retained during the probationary period. 
 Non-supervisory ranks (currently POI, POII, and MPO) would be altered to provide wider opportunities for career progression, with a rank similar to Corporal in other agencies being considered.
 The highest non-supervisory rank, currently Master Police Officer, would have the authority to act as a supervisor in the absence of a Sergeant or higher-ranking officer.
 Dedicated detective ranks, or pay grades, are suggested, rather than the current system in which officers are simply assigned to detective duties.

Helicopter Division 

The Helicopter Division was initially formed  in 1972 with the  donation of an Enstrom F-28 helicopter by a local businessman.  It suspended operation in 1975. In 1983, the Division was reformed as a full-time operation with two Bell 206 Jet Rangers. Formerly based out of Dulles Airport, it is now based out of the Fairfax County Fire and Rescue Training Academy on West Ox Road. It provided aeromedical transportation, traffic reporting and airborne law enforcement capabilities to the growing metropolitan area. The around the clock staffing consisting of a Pilot, Police Officer/Paramedic and a Flight Nurse from Inova Fairfax Hospital. In 1991, Inova Fairfax separated from the Helicopter Division at which time the Flight Nurse was replaced with a second Police Officer/Paramedic.  This is the crew configuration with which the Helicopter Division still flies today. In 1997, the Division grew to a more capable and robust helicopter, the Bell 407. In 2011, the Division purchased its first Bell 429. The purchase of the Bell 429 made the Division the first multi-mission operator in the world to utilize this new airframe.  Modern design characteristics of the Bell 429 allow adaptation to future missions needs, reduced/simplified maintenance, as well as improved longevity/service lifetime.  Some of the highlights of the Bell 429 are twin engine redundancy, military grade sensors, night vision goggle technology and a lower noise signature which allow for safe and neighborly helicopter operations.

Urbanization
The continued urbanization of the county creates additional impacts on the ability of the department to provide service to the community. The department is studying the impacts of the proposed redevelopment of Tysons Corner, and other projects throughout the county that will result in more transit-oriented land use patterns. As a result of preliminary impact assessments of ongoing and future development patterns in the county, the department anticipates a future need to create two new patrol districts, while realigning existing districts to accommodate the demands created by this anticipated growth. The Patrol Bureau is developing mechanisms for predicting the level of staffing that may be required in the future to meet these challenges while maintaining service quality.

Equipment
Fairfax County Police carry the Sig Sauer P226 as their on-duty firearm. Some officers carry Glock 22 S&W .40

Fairfax County Police drive the Ford Police Interceptor Sedan and Utility while on patrol. The department also possesses limited numbers of Dodge Chargers and Chevrolet Tahoe, Impala, and Caprice PPV vehicles, which are operated by some of the department's various specialty units.

Fairfax County Police Helicopter Division operates two Bell 429 GlobalRanger.

Inside FCPD
Channel 16 is the Fairfax County local Government-access television cable TV channel which delivers news and information about Fairfax County as well as Educational-access television programming. The Fairfax County Police Department has a 30-minute television show on Channel 16, which airs five times a week, titled 'Inside FCPD' which seeks to educate the public on the mission of the department and provide information on public safety.

Programs
Fairfax County Police has several programs that are ongoing and short-term, depending on the needs of the community. Some examples include

Honor Guard

Founded in 1980, the Ceremonial Honor Guard is a non-standing unit made up of career and auxiliary officers. It is one of the largest police Honor Guards in Virginia with 43 specially selected officers from the department's rank and file. Selection criteria include prior experience, professional image, uniform appearance, personal grooming standards, motivation, stature/bearing, interest in Honor Guard activities, and positive attitude. In 2008, they participated in 83 events and assignments and monthly practices to ensure their readiness at a moment's notice.

Road DAWG (Don't Associate With Gangs)

Increased gang activity across the region prompted growth in the number of Road DAWG camps in the
county from one to three (at Mount Vernon, Reston and West Springfield Districts). The camp program was created to build healthy decision-making skills; help youths resist the draw of gangs and show them a fun and friendly side of police officers.

Soccer Program for At-Risk Youths

Members of Hispanic communities in the Franconia District and police officers came together to produce a series of soccer tournaments for kids between the ages of 7 and 16. The aim of "United for the Sport" is to build stronger relationships between the two. It continues today with the addition of human services, social services, and other county agencies.

Communications

In 2008, the Public Information Office embraced new technology and new media to launch the department's messages to more
members of the public. Taking advantage of the social networking phenomena, information was posted on Fairfax County's Facebook and Twitter accounts, which are monitored and maintained by the Office of Public Affairs. In addition, the police department started an FCPD YouTube site, posting informational and educational videos and information.

Attention to Senior Citizens

Seniors and Law Enforcement (SALT) is a joint program to address crime-related and public safety issues affecting seniors in the community. Franconia District crime prevention officers met with SALT council members on a monthly basis to discuss safety and emergency preparedness.

Animal Protection Police

Animal Control officers are specially trained law enforcement officers who investigate dog bites and attacks and
complaints of animal cruelty. They respond to emergencies involving sick or injured
domestic and wild animals. They're also tasked with enforcing county codes and state laws pertaining to animals.
They remove strays from the community, often impounding them at the Fairfax County Animal Shelter where many can be reunited with their owners or adopted by new owners.

Explorer Program
Young people between the ages of 14 and 21, male and female, with an interest in possible law enforcement careers fill the ranks of the Fairfax County Law Enforcement Explorer Post 1742, 2252, and 505. Active since 1975, post 1742 supports the mission of the Fairfax
County Police Department by providing volunteer support at police and community events. Post 2252 was created in 2014 to serve the youth of the South County/Mt. Vernon Areas. Post 505 is the newest being created in the fall of 2015 to serve central Fairfax. In addition to service, the Explorers learn and compete in events testing some of the basic skills involved in a wide range of police assignments.

Fallen officers
Since the establishment of the Fairfax County Police Department, five officers have died while on duty.

30-year-old Karen J. Bassford became the first Fairfax County police officer to be killed in the line of duty when she lost control of her police cruiser and crashed on Gallows Road near Vienna while responding to a report of a burglary in progress early on the morning of July 27, 1977. Officer Bassford was ejected from the vehicle in the crash and suffered massive head injuries. She was taken to Fairfax Hospital, where she was pronounced dead on arrival.

While on a training run near Front Royal, Virginia, 51-year-old Captain Tommy F. Bernal was fatally injured on June 28, 2001, when his motorcycle was struck by a Ford Explorer that had swerved to avoid hitting another rider in the group.

Frederick von Meister died while he was running around a football field while he was off duty.

On May 8, 2006, 40-year-old Detective Vicky O. Armel and 53-year-old Master Police Officer Michael E. Garbarino was mortally wounded in an attack on the Sully District Police Station by 18-year-old Michael W. Kennedy, a mentally ill man who opened fire on the station during a shift change before he himself was killed. MPO Garbarino, who had been shot five times in Kennedy's attack, died at Inova Fairfax Hospital early on the morning of May 17, 2006.

2nd Lieutenant Francis J. Stecco drowned while participating in a training exercise in Pohick Bay on October 21, 2008. The 42-year-old Stecco was wearing a dry suit when he disappeared while a police helicopter hovered overhead. Lieutenant Stecco's corpse was finally recovered on October 25.

Controversies

On August 29, 2013, John Geer was shot to death by Fairfax County Police Officer Adam Torres, after a 40-minute standoff. Geer was unarmed, but a gun was reportedly on the ground away from his body, as he stood inside the doorway of his Springfield house. Geer had his hands raised in the air as he was shot. Geer's partner filed a lawsuit, and was settled in 2015 for $3 million. Torres was indicted on the charge of second degree murder on August 17, 2015, and turned himself in to authorities. Torres was scheduled to stand trial on April 18, 2016.

Several high profile and controversial officer-involved shootings, including the death of Geer, and one automobile accident where citizens were killed by Fairfax County police officers have led to calls for an independent review board to be appointed. On March 3, 2015, the Fairfax County Board of Supervisors established an ad hoc commission to review the police department's policies, practices, and programs regarding police-community relations, police-involved incidents, and public release of information. A report with recommendations from the commission was expected to be released in October 2015.

References

External links

Government in Fairfax County, Virginia
County police departments of Virginia
1940 establishments in Virginia
Government agencies established in 1940